Dominica–United States relations are bilateral relations between the Commonwealth of Dominica and the United States of America.

Overview
The United States and the Commonwealth of Dominica have positive bilateral relations.  The United States supports the Dominican government's efforts to expand its economic base and to provide a higher standard of living for its citizens. U.S. assistance is primarily channeled through multilateral agencies such as the World Bank and the Caribbean Development Bank (CDB), as well as through the U.S. Agency for International Development (USAID) office in Bridgetown, Barbados. The Peace Corps also provides technical assistance to the Commonwealth of Dominica, and has volunteers on the island working primarily in education, youth development, and health.

The United States and the Commonwealth of Dominica work together in the struggle against illegal drugs. Dominica cooperates with U.S. agencies and participates in counter-narcotics programs in an effort to curb drug trafficking and marijuana cultivation. In 1995, the Dominican government signed a maritime law enforcement agreement with the United States to strengthen counter-narcotics coordination, and in 1996, the government signed mutual legal assistance and extradition treaties to enhance joint efforts in combating international crime.

Dominica had around 252,000 visitors in 2005, which represented a contraction in both cruise line and stay-over arrivals over the record performance set in 2004. It is estimated that 4,500 Americans reside in the country.

Principal U.S. officials include:
 Ambassador—Mary M. Ourisman
 Deputy Chief of Mission—O.P. Garza
 Political/Economic Counselor—Ian Campbell
 Consul General—Clyde Howard Jr.
 Regional Labor Attaché—Jake Aller
 Commercial Affairs—Jake Aller
 Public Affairs Officer—John Roberts
 Peace Corps Director—Kate Raftery

Embassies
The United States maintains no official presence in the Commonwealth of Dominica.  The Ambassador and Embassy officers are resident in Barbados and frequently travel to Dominica.

See also
 Dominican Americans (Dominica)
 North American Union
 North American Free Trade Agreement
 Free Trade Area of the Americas
 Third Border Initiative
 Caribbean Community
 Caribbean Basin Initiative (CBI)
 Caribbean Basin Trade Partnership Act
 Western Hemisphere Travel Initiative
 Foreign relations of the United States
 Foreign relations of Dominica
 List of ambassadors of Dominica to the United States

References

External links
 History of Dominica - U.S. relations
 The United States Department of State - The Commonwealth of Dominica

 
Bilateral relations of the United States
United States